Muscina prolapsa is a species of fly from the family Muscidae.

References

Muscidae
Diptera of Europe
Insects described in 1780